Frank Ford (25 December 1907 – 8 March 1974) was an Australian rules footballer who played with Richmond and Essendon in the Victorian Football League (VFL).

Ford, a rover and forward, was the leading goal-kicker in the 1929 Bendigo Football League season with 62 goals. The Sandhurst player made 16 appearances for Richmond in 1931. The last of those was their 1931 VFL Grand Final loss, which he started from a forward pocket.

He joined Essendon in 1932 and was their third leading goal-kicker in his debut season in 22 goals. After one more season he returned to Bendigo and resumed at Sandhurst.

Ford had a brother, Bill Ford, who played for Richmond and Hawthorn.

References

1907 births
Australian rules footballers from Victoria (Australia)
Richmond Football Club players
Essendon Football Club players
Sandhurst Football Club players
1974 deaths